Prokhorenko is a gender-neutral Ukrainian surname that may refer to
Alexander Prokhorenko (1990–2016), Russian Spetsnaz officer
Yuriy Prokhorenko (born 1951), Ukrainian pole vaulter
Zhanna Prokhorenko (1940–2011), Soviet actress

See also
 

Ukrainian-language surnames